S v Bernardus 1965 (3) SA 287 (A), an important case in South African criminal law, was one of unlawful assault (the throwing of a stick) which had resulted in death. The majority of the court, rejecting the view suggested by Hoexter JA in S v van der Mescht, that intention on the part of an accused to assault might, in the event of the victim's dying as a result of such assault, be sufficient to support a conviction of the assailant for culpable homicide, held that the correct criterion was that of foreseeability.

See also 
 South African criminal law

References 
 S v Bernardus 1965 (3) SA 287 (A).
 S v van der Mescht 1962 (1) SA 521 (A).

Notes 

1965 in South African law
1965 in case law
South African criminal case law
Appellate Division (South Africa) cases